Ostad Homayoun Khorram, (June 30, 1930 – January 17, 2013) was an Iranian musician, composer, violinist, and a member of the high council of Iran's house of music.

Khorram began his music career as a violinist at the age of 10 by participating in master Abolhassan Saba violin and Radif classes. After four years of lessons, Khorram entered the State National Radio Orchestra as a violin soloist and afterwards as a concert maestro.
Due to the genius musical talent and passion he start to work as a leading composer of the National Radio at the age of 21.

At the same time with music education, he followed up academic education and acquired MSc degree in electrical engineering. On one occasion, Khorram commented that he found music and engineering complementary rather than contradictory, both having roots in mathematics.

During his career specially as soloist and composer in the famous radio musical program Golha Khorram composed many songs
for notable singers including Hossein Ghavami (Fakhteh), Marzieh, Hayedeh, Shajarian and made over a hundreds of instrumental pieces for violin and orchestra, charmezrabs, overtures in collaboration with outstanding contemporary artists including Javad Maroufi, Jalil Shahnaz, and Farhang Sharif. In recent years, he worked with such young talented singers as Mohammad Esfahani and Alireza Ghorbani.
He was also responsible for helping to bring the famous Iranian singer Moein onto the stage.

Works
Ghoghaye Setaregan
...

Copyright
Reza Khoram (son of Homayoun Khoram) published a letter of protest from the news agencies alleging that the rights of Homayoun Khoram's works were not respected, in which he and his family protested against the theft of his father's works by some musicians. The letter states:

Publications

Several books have been published by, or on behalf of, Khorram:

 Navaye Mehr (1) written with the efforts of Mr. Babak Shahraki.
 Navaye Mehr (2) written with the efforts of Mr. Mohammad reza Torabian.
 Ghoghaye Setaregan written with the efforts of Mr. Ali Vakili علی وکیلی.
 Chahar Magham (چهارمقام) is written by Dr. Mohsen Kazemian ( دکتر محسن کاظمیان). this book is the newest book which is published about Homayoun Khorram, and included the new proposed techniques and theory which are offered by the author.

References

External links
  (video)

1930 births
2013 deaths
Deaths from cancer in Iran
Deaths from colorectal cancer
People from Bushehr
Iranian violinists
Iranian composers
20th-century violinists